Samūm ( also spelled Simoom or Semum; from the root  s-m-m,  "to poison") is a fire related to demons in Ancient Arabic lore and later Islamic beliefs. As a kind of fire, it is also the origin of some kinds of evil spirits and further identified with both the fires of hell and the fire of the sun. The Samum probably originated from Jewish lore as an anthropomorphization of poisonous wind, which was probably also the origin of the concept of Samael and his lesser devils. Islam further develops the relation between the fires of Samum and Satan by asserting, that he or at least his minor devils, are created from the fires of Samum.

Etymology 
The term Samūm derives from the root s-m-m , which means "to poison". It is also used of referring to a hot, dusty desert wind. In Talmudic and post-Talmudic literature the wind of Samum became a demon and the name of the Midrashic devil Samael is linguistical related to it. Johann Gottfried Eichhorn relates the term to the Three Days of Darkness in Book of Exodus. Accordingly, the darkness comes just with the tempest of Samum. In Islamic traditions, it is usually interpreted as a kind of fire, which penetrates through the skin of human body in contrast to marijin min nar. However, both fires became usually associated with dangerous spirits. Later, Manichaeans referred to the pestilential wind in one of the five Kingdoms of the Prince of Darkness as Samum.

Composition 
Tabari offers many interpretations for the nature of samūm. In one interpretation he provides, samūm is "hot wind which kills" and in another "the flame of the fire of the hot wind" and yet in another he relates it to "night-wind" in opposition to harur (day-wind). Further, he states, some hold samūm to be the hell-fire (nar jahannama). On the authority of Abu Ubaidah, samūm is the fire that "penetrates the pores due to its fineness in the day-time as well as at night". Abu Sãlih is reported as saying that samūm is smokeless fire located between the heavens and the veil. Tabari concludes, it is the heart of a flame and not wind, as others indicated. According to Ibn Abbas, the samūm is "the worst hot fire which kills". On the authority of 'Amir ibn Dinar, samūm is the fire of the sun. Cosmographics in the medieval age of Islam usually depicted the sun setting on the gates of hell, and deriving its heat from the fires of hell (i.e. nar as-samum) during night. On day time, the sun emits the fire of hell over earth. Most mufassirs repeat the mentioned interpretations, but usually more briefly.

Spirits 
The Pre-Islamic Bedouins believed in various spirits, such as jinn, afarit and demons. One of these spirits is the whirlwind Samum. Quran exegetes (mufassirs) however, usually do not refer to Samum as a creature on its own but to the origin of a specific entity. Authorized by Ibn Abbas, Tabari distinguishes between angels created from light, the jinn created from a mixture of fire, and Iblis and the angels among him as created from the Fires of Samum. In some accounts, this tribe of angels is called Al-Hinn. Another story regards the Fires of Samum as the origin of a wife for Iblis, created by God after Iblis was banished from heaven, with whom he begot the demons.
According to Al-Suyuti, Samum is the primogenitor of spirits.

Popular culture 
Studies in Ottoman lore mention the hotwind Samum as a Div, who assists Iblis in his plots against the prophet Solomon. He is also named Rothwind. The 2008 Turkish horror film Semum is about a Samūm, allegedly based on different independent narrations about possessed people, claiming to encountered a demon called Samum. This Samum is depicted as a creature from hell itself, summoned by a witch forced to possess a woman. Samum is fashioned after the Islamic conception of a devil.

See also
Ghaddar
Zabaniyya

References

s
Fire in religion
Islamic terminology
s